George William Stevenson (born 30 August 1938) is a Labour Party politician in the United Kingdom.

In 1984 he was elected as the Member of the European Parliament (MEP) for Staffordshire East. He was elected Member of Parliament (MP) for Stoke-on-Trent South at the 1992 general election. He stood down from the European Parliament in 1994 and left the UK parliament at the 2005 general election. He was succeeded as MP for Stoke-on-Trent (South) by Rob Flello of the Labour Party.

He had previously been deputy leader of Stoke-on-Trent City Council. In 2002, Stevenson stood for the Labour Party in the first election for a directly elected mayor for Stoke-on-Trent, losing to the independent candidate Mike Wolfe, a former Labour Party member.

References

External links 
 

1938 births
Living people
Labour Party (UK) MPs for English constituencies
Transport and General Workers' Union-sponsored MPs
UK MPs 1992–1997
UK MPs 1997–2001
UK MPs 2001–2005
Councillors in Staffordshire
People from Stoke-on-Trent
Labour Party (UK) MEPs
MEPs for England 1984–1989
MEPs for England 1989–1994
Politicians from Staffordshire